Qaravol-e Hajji Taji (also Romanized as Qarāvol-e Ḩājjī Tājī; also known as Qarāvol) is a village in Kongor Rural District, in the Central District of Kalaleh County, Golestan Province, Iran. At the 2006 census, its population was 915, in 218 families.

References 

Populated places in Kalaleh County